Benenden Health (formerly The Post Office and Civil Service Sanatorium Society) is a not-for-profit mutual society in the UK providing private medical cover. Its membership consists of over 800,000 individuals and employees of corporate schemes provided by them. Benenden Health was the shirt sponsor of York City Football Club from the 2012–13 season until the 2018-2019 season.

History
The Post Office Branch of the National Association for the Establishment and Maintenance of Sanatoria for Workers Suffering from Tuberculosis Friendly Society was founded in 1905 to help working class Post Office employees control costs of the tuberculosis epidemic when conventional medical insurance was not widely affordable. The business model of weekly member fees was proposed by a Post Office clerk, Charles Garland.

In 1923 the name became The Post Office and Civil Service Sanatorium Society, as the membership was opened to a new industry. In October 1990, the registered office moved from London to York.

On 1 January 2010, the Society changed its name to the Benenden Healthcare Society.

Membership was restricted to those employed in the public sector, both at national and local level, which led to difficulties as many functions were being outsourced and, consequently, membership began to decline. In June 2012, delegates at Benenden Health's annual conference in Manchester voted to remove restrictions on membership. Also in June 2012, Benenden Health became shirt sponsor of York City Football Club. This sponsorship ended in the summer of 2019.

In early 2018, the Society rebranded using the trading style "Benenden Health".

Benenden Hospital

Benenden Hospital was founded in 1907 near Benenden, Kent as a sanatorium location for tuberculosis treatment and became a centre for hospital treatment for members of Trade Unions and Friendly Societies, and subsequently public sector employees.

Benenden Hospital in its original form as ‘Benenden Sanatorium’ was designed by Augustus William West, following pre-Bauhaus principles. The building is an example of early British modernist architecture.

The hospital is now administered by Benenden Hospital Trust and is used by local National Health Service agencies and patients who use private medical insurance or who pay directly for their own hospital care. It is also one of a national network of 26 hospital facilities at which Benenden Health can authorise surgical and other treatment procedures. The hospital was rated outstanding by the Care Quality Commission in May 2017.  22% of its activity is now commissioned by the NHS, mostly orthopaedic, gynaecology and ophthalmology surgery for adults.

Awards 

 Most Trusted Health Insurance Provider - Moneywise Customer Service Awards 2014 and in 2015
 Most Trusted Health Insurance Provider via Employer – Moneywise Customer Service Awards 2019
 100 Best Not-for-Profit Organisations 2019 – The Sunday Times
 Best Healthcare Service at the Investment Life & Pensions Moneyfacts Awards 2019

Sponsorships 
In January 2013, Benenden Health began their sponsorship deal with York City Football Club. After 7 years of sponsoring York City Football Club, it was announced by York City chairman Jason McGill that Benenden Health will end their sponsorship.

Benenden Health have been a main sponsor of York Pride since 2012, this is an annual celebration for York and North Yorkshire’s LGBT community.

References

Further reading

 Benenden: The History of The Benenden Healthcare Society 1905-2005, Bill McPate, 2006, William Sessions Limited, York.
 Caring for Generations: The Benenden Story 1905-2005, Sarah Smelik, 2005, Leeds Press Ltd, Leeds.
 Post Office & Civil Service Sanatorium Society: A History 1905-1980, Kingfisher-Kent, Tunbridge Wells.

External links
Benenden website
benenden hospital website

Mutual organizations
Medical and health organisations based in the United Kingdom
1905 establishments in the United Kingdom
Organizations established in 1905
Private medicine in the United Kingdom